Marie-Louise O'Murphy (21 October 1737 – 11 December 1814), also variously called Mademoiselle de Morphy, La Belle Morphise, Louise Morfi or  Marie-Louise Morphy de Boisfailly, was one of the lesser mistresses (petites maîtresses) of King Louis XV of France and possibly the model for the famous painting by François Boucher.

Birth
Marie-Louise O'Murphy (or Morfi) was born in Rouen on 21 October 1737 as the youngest of twelve children of Daniel Morfi and Marguerite Iquy. She was baptized the same day in the church of Saint Eloi:

Irish ancestry
The family of Marie-Louise O'Murphy was of Irish origin, who settled in Normandy. The presence of her paternal grandfather Daniel Murphy is attested in Pont-Audemer at the end of the 17th century, when his first wife Marguerite Connard (Irish like him) died. Militant of the Jacobite army, he followed the deposed King James II of England to his exile in the Château de Saint-Germain-en-Laye; in consequence all the Catholic regiments who remained loyal to the King were sentenced to death in absentia by the new English government.

Very little is known about the grandfather of Marie-Louise O'Murphy, except that he was one of the soldiers fired after the Treaty of Ryswick in 1697. Daniel Murphy (variously named Morfil, Morfi or Morphy), moved to Rouen by 1699, when he married his second wife Brigitte Quoin; according to the parish records of Saint Eloi, in his marriage certificate he is designated as master shoemaker (maître cordonnier).

His son, Daniel Morfi, father of Marie-Louise O'Murphy, married Marguerite Iquy, also Irish, on 21 January 1714 in the parish of Saint Eloi in Rouen:

Of the twelve children born to the couple between 1714 and 1737, five died shortly after birth and seven survived to adulthood: five daughters (Marguerite-Louise, Marie-Brigitte, Marie-Madeleine, Marie-Victoire, Marie-Louise); and two sons (Jean-François and Michel-Augustin).

An uprooted and degraded family
Marie-Louise's parents had well-known criminal histories: Daniel Morfi was involved in a case of espionage and blackmail, while Marguerite Iquy was accused of prostitution and theft. Daniel Morfi appears in the records of the Bastille, where he was confined "for state business" after his arrest on 23 February 1735. An unscrupulous collaborator, then identified as secretary of Charles O'Brien, 6th Viscount Clare accused him of stealing diplomatic correspondence that his master kept in secret with James Francis Edward Stuart (known as "The Old Pretender"), the pretender to the English throne, then exiled in Rome. Daniel Morfi had tried to blackmail James Francis, by threatening to sell to the court of London the papers he had stolen. The case undermines the French Government, by revealing secret diplomatic negotiations in favor of the restoration of the Stuarts. The arrest record showed that Daniel Morfi possessed a handwritten letter of the Cardinal de Fleury, a letter from Viscount Clare and a letter from James Francis Stuart himself, containing his plans for the Restoration. Daniel Morfi was held incommunicado for seven months at the Bastille; after this, he was able to join his wife and children, but all were locked under close supervision into the Abbey of Arcis near Nogent-le-Rotrou. This confinement was terminated on 21 December 1736: Daniel Morfi was allowed to go wherever he wished, except Paris. Thus, with his family, he returned to Rouen, where Marie-Louise was born a year later.

Margaret Iquy, wife of Daniel Morfi, also left her traces in legal history. Arrested on 10 May 1729, along with Anne Galtier, she was conducted to the prison of For-l'Évêque, and later imprisoned in the Salpêtrière. Nicknamed "The Englishwoman" (l’Anglaise), she was 29 years old and recorded as originating in Saint-Germain-en-Laye; the inspector who arrested her declares that "these two prostitutes lived in debauchery with a young man of family" and "it was by the solicitation of these two women that this young man had done to his aunt a considerable theft".

The sisters of Marie-Louise O'Murphy are also known for being involved in prostitution. Jean Meunier, police inspector who was in charge of monitoring girls and women involved in this work, dedicated several pages to the O'Murphy sisters in the diary that he wrote from 1747 and in a report made in 1753 for his superior Nicolas René Berryer, lieutenant général de police. On 12 May 1753 Meunier dedicated three pages to the five O'Murphy sisters: Marguerite, Brigitte, Madeleine, Victoire and Marie-Louise. About Marguerite and Madeleine (nicknamed Magdelon), he notes that they have their "campaigns in Flanders" following the French army, but before their departure would often be in the company of their sister Victorie and "the Richardot, the Duval, the Beaudouin, the Fleurance and other women of the world". About Brigitte, Meunier wrote that "she always stayed with her parents and she wasn't either brilliant or noisy"; however, he concluded that "despite her ugliness we are sure that she wasn't an innocent girl".

This is probably a similar account to the information written by Marquis d'Argenson in his diary on 1 April 1753 about Marie-Louise O'Murphy:

After the death of her father on 4 June 1753, Marie-Louise's mother brought the family to Paris.

Model of François Boucher
In contemporary and modern historiography it is believed Marie-Louise O'Murphy was the very young model who posed for the Jeune Fille allongée (Reclining Girl), of François Boucher, a painting famous for its undisguised eroticism, dating from 1752. Two versions of this painting have survived, both conserved in Germany, one in the Alte Pinakothek at Munich and the other in the Wallraf-Richartz Museum at Cologne. Boucher, at the height of his fame, had made a specialty of these deliberately licentious nudes, represented in lascivious poses within a mythological context. La Jeune Fille allongée, also known as l'Odalisque blonde (the Blonde Odalisque), echoes the also erotic Odalisque brune (Brown Odalisque), painted around 1745, several copies of which are kept at the Louvre or the Museum of Fine Arts, Rheims.

In his Histoire de ma vie (vol. 3, chap. 11), Giacomo Casanova relates that he found her "a pretty, ragged, dirty, little creature" of thirteen years in the house of her actress sister. Struck by her beauty when seeing her naked, however, he had a nude portrait of her painted, with the inscription "O-Morphi" (punning her name with Modern Greek ὄμορφη, "beautiful"), a copy of which found its way to King Louis XV, who then asked to see if the original corresponded with the painting:

In his account of those events, which were written many years later, the Venetian seducer seeks to obtain the central role, even though he was perhaps only a partial witness. He did not specifically cite Boucher and seems rather, in the evening of his life, to have recorded this episode from gossip and pamphlets which circulated very freely in Europe at the end of the 18th century. Other sources are more accurate.

Police inspector Jean Meunier echoes in his diary another version of the facts, that circulates in the months following the meeting of Louis XV and Marie-Louise O'Murphy. On 8 May 1753 he wrote very specifically:

Petite maîtresse of Louis XV
The term petite maîtresse (little mistress) was given to Louis XV's mistresses that were not formally presented at court, and unlike the official mistress (maîtresse-en-titre) did not have an apartment in the Palace of Versailles. Generally recruited by the King's valets in Paris' surroundings, if their affair lasted more than a single night, they were placed in a group of houses in the district of Parc-aux-Cerfs in Versailles, or close to other royal residences. Marie-Louise O'Murphy resided there for two years, from 1753 to 1755.

Different stories circulated about the exact circumstances in which she was presented to the King. As was previously mentioned, according to Meunier's reports, this was thanks to the mediation of Abel-François Poisson de Vandières, brother of Madame de Pompadour, showing Boucher's portrait to Louis XV. Another version supports the theory that the recruitment of Louis XV's little mistresses was done under the control of the inner circle of Madame de Pompadour:

Monsieur de Vandières, Director of the King's Buildings (Bâtiments du Roi) in a letter dated 19 February 1753, gave a peculiar order to the painter Charles-Joseph Natoire in Rome, who provides elements that suggests that he was in possession of the portrait of Marie-Louise O'Murphy made by Boucher, and he was able to show it to the King:

Then it is Dominique-Guillaume Lebel, first valet of the King's chamber, who had the delicate and secret mission to negotiate the "virginity" of the girl and bring her back to Versailles. Thus the Marquis d'Argenson in his diary, dated on 1 April 1753, recorded that "Lebel was in Paris to bring a new virgin ... then he contacted a dressmaker named Fleuret, who provides the lovers with dresses from his shop at Saint Honoré". By 30 March, he still did not know the identity of Marie-Louise O'Murphy and he refers to a "little girl who was a model in Boucher" and the King "would have seen Lebel his valet".

After a miscarriage in mid-1753 which almost killed her (as a result this merely brought Louis XV closer to her because he loved the idea that she had almost died "in service" as a proof of her affection for him), Marie-Louise O'Murphy gave birth to Louis XV's illegitimate daughter, Agathe-Louise de Saint-Antoine de Saint-André, born in Paris on 20 June 1754 and baptized that same day at Saint-Paul as a child of "Louis de Saint-André, Old official of infantry and Louise-Marie de Berhini, resident of Saint-Antoine street", both non-existent persons; the King (who did not want to recognize the offspring born from petites maîtresses and brief affairs) ordered that the newborn must be immediately placed in care of a wet nurse. Subsequently, Agathe-Louise was sent to the Couvent de la Présentation, where she was raised; Louis XV paid a pension for his daughter and appointed Louis Yon, Secretary of the Comptroller of Finances and Jean-Michel Delage, a notary, both trustworthy men, as her legal guardians.

Marie-Louise Morphy de Boisfailly

The name of "Marie-Louise Morphy de Boisfailly" that she used in the second part of her life was invented for her first marriage.

After serving as a mistress to the King for almost two years, Marie-Louise O'Murphy made a mistake that was common for many courtesans, that of trying to replace the official mistress. She unwisely tried to unseat the longtime royal favorite, Madame de Pompadour. This ill-judged move quickly resulted in O'Murphy's downfall at court.

In November 1755 Marie-Louise O'Murphy was expelled at night from her home at Parc-aux-Cerfs. Repudiated by the King, she was sent far away from Versailles:

She was hastily married on 25 November 1755, by contract signed before Mr. Patu, notary in Paris, to Jacques Pelet de Beaufranchet, Seigneur d'Ayat (born 5 March 1728). The marriage was arranged by the inner circle of Madame de Pompadour. The Duke of Luynes and the Marquis de Valfons recorded that the Prince of Soubise and the Marquis de Lugeac received the task to find a husband for Marie-Louise O'Murphy and arrange her marriage. The intended husband was chosen with great care: well born, with a good name for the former Petite maîtresse, young and good-looking. Beaufranchet, a good soldier and without fortune, obeyed the King's order.

It was in order to give Marie-Louise O'Murphy a better status before her future in-laws and to spare the aristocrat sensibilities of Beaufranchet, that the young woman received the surname of Morphy de Boisfailly, and called a daughter of Daniel Morphy de Boisfailly, an Irish gentleman. As a dowry, she received the sum of 200,000 livres, a disguised donation from Louis XV, through the father Vanier, canon of the Royal and Collegiate Church of Saint-Paul de Lestrée at Saint-Denis; in addition, she was allowed to keep the clothes and jewelry received from the King during her stay at Parc-aux-Cerfs.

The engagement took place the next day and the wedding was celebrated on 27 November 1755 in the parish of Saints Innocents, in the greatest secrecy. Beaufranchet's parents remained in the province and sent their proxies to the wedding. By the side of Marie-Louise, no family member was present. Her mother was represented by a lawyer of the Parlement called Noël Duval, and none of her sisters was present, perhaps to spare the "mighty Seigneur d'Ayat" a painful confrontation with his humble and scandalous in-laws.

Later life

Soon, the new Dame d'Ayat became pregnant. Her first child, a daughter named Louise Charlotte Antoinette Françoise Pelet de Beaufranchet, was born on 30 October 1756. Thirteen months later, on 5 November 1757, Jacques Pelet de Beaufranchet was killed in action at the battle of Rossbach, and seventeen days later (22 November), Marie-Louise gave birth to a second child, a son, Louis Charles Antoine Pelet de Beaufranchet, the later Comte de Beaufranchet and General under the Republic.

Her daughter Louise Charlotte died on 6 February 1759, aged two. Thirteen days later, on 19 February at Riom, Marie-Louise married her second husband, François Nicolas Le Normant, Comte de Flaghac and Receiver General of Finance in Riom (born 13 September 1725), a divorcee with three children. Her new husband being a distant cousin of Charles Guillaume Le Normant d'Étiolles and Charles François Paul Le Normant de Tournehem, through this marriage Marie-Louise became related to Madame de Pompadour. In addition, and thanks to her closeness with Abbot Ferray, the former royal mistress was able to enter into the finance world and thanks to the traffic of influences, had access to the Ferme générale, which enabled her to expand her assets and fortune. From her second marriage, Marie-Louise gave birth to a daughter, Marguerite Victoire Le Normant de Flaghac (5 January 1768 – 25 January 1830), who, according to one theory, could be another illegitimate daughter of Louis XV.

In 1779, she bought a palace in Paris at the Rue du Faubourg-Poissonière, built in 1773 in the neoclassical style by the architect Samson-Nicolas Lenoir, known as the Hôtel Benoist de Sainte Paulle, which still stands today. In 1782 at Villennes-sur-Seine, she bought the Migneaux estate, where she had a house built. After the death of her second husband on 24 April 1783 (who left her a pension of 12,000 francs), she had to resell this property in 1785.

On 22 September 1787, she bought from the Choiseuls, for the amount 220,000 livres, a lordship in Soisy-sous-Etiolles, in the immediate vicinity of Etiolles, the former residence of the Marquise de Pompadour. In the last years of the Ancien Régime, Marie-Louise was very close to Claude Antoine de Valdec de Lessart, appointed Controller General of Finance, at the end of 1790, following Necker's dismissal. In 1791, he also became Minister of the Interior but was arrested on 10 March 1792 and massacred by sans-culottes on 9 September 1792.

Following the murder of Valdec de Lessart, Marie-Louise then retired to Le Havre, and, unable to flee the country, returned to her castle in Soisy-sous-Etiolles, where she was arrested in February 1794. She was then incarcerated as a "suspect", under the name of O'Murphy, at Sainte-Pélagie Prison and later at the English Benedictine convent in Paris, known as the Couvent des Anglaises. The influence of her son and that of her nephew General Louis Desaix (son of her sister-in-law Amable de Beaufranchet) enabled her to escape the guillotine, and she was released after the fall of Robespierre in July 1794.

After her release, Marie-Louise found a new protector in the person of Louis Philippe Dumont (17 November 1765 – 11 June 1853), a moderate MP for Calvados in the National Convention and twenty-eight years younger than her. They married on 19 June 1795 at Soisy-sous-Etiolles; however, this union quickly failed, and after almost three years, they divorced on 16 March 1798. She never married again.

In 1795, she sold her Parisian palace. On 7 December 1798, she resold her domain of Soisy-sous-Etiolles to General Lecourbe, and spent the rest of her life in retirement.

In 1811 her first great-grandchild was born, Louise Antoinette Zoé Terreyre (daughter of Anne Pauline Victoire Laure Pelet de Beaufranchet d'Ayat, who was the daughter of Marie-Louise's son, the Comte de Beaufranchet). Another great-grandchild, Louise Thérèse Mesnard de Chousy (daughter of Alfred Mesnard, comte de Chousy, son of Marguerite Victoire Le Normant de Flaghac), became the wife of Edmond-Charles de Martimprey, a French soldier, who briefly served as Governor General of Algeria, and then became Senator of France during the Second French Empire. 

Marie-Louise O'Murphy died in Paris on 11 December 1814 aged 77, at the home of her daughter, Marguerite Le Normant.

Notes

References

Attribution:

Bibliography

 Casanova, Giacomo: Histoire de ma vie, F.A. Brockhaus, Wiesbaden et Plon, Paris 1960–1961.
 
 Schulz, Alexander: Louison O'Morphy. Bouchers Modell für das Ruhende Mädchen, Isny, Andreas Schultz, 1998, 80 p.
 Sprott, Duncan: Our Lady of the potatoes, Faber and Faber, Londres, 1997, 235 p.

1737 births
1814 deaths
People from Rouen
French artists' models
Courtesans from Paris
French people of Irish descent
Mistresses of Louis XV
People of the French Revolution